Xie Feng may refer to:
Xie Feng (footballer) (born 1966), Chinese retired footballer
Xie Feng (politician) (1922-2004), Chinese politician, Governor of Hebei 1986-88
Xie Feng (diplomat) (谢锋, born 1964), Chinese diplomat

See also
Xifeng (disambiguation)